Hussey-Regan was a collaborative project between Wayne Hussey (The Mission) and Julianne Regan (All About Eve). The duo started to work together in 2006, as well as their other personal projects. In 2011 they released their first album, Curios.

Detailed history

Formation
Hussey and Regan have had a long association with their respective bands having toured together, as well as each artist appearing on various recordings of the other's work. Although they had been loosely working on ideas since 2006, in an interview with Andrew Collins on BBC 6 Music, Hussey revealed that both he and Regan were collaborating but did not have any firm plans at that time. Hussey later announced via the Mission World Information Service (MWIS) "It's a fairly loose remit with the only criterions being that we record songs we both like and we, Julianne and I, play all the instruments ourselves... Some songs will be duets and some will feature one of us more than the other...We have absolutely no plans for playing live, no plans yet for release, all we're gonna do is record a bunch of songs and see where it takes us." In the same announcement they also invited fans to submit ideas for cover songs via The MWIS Forum.

Making it official
In July 2009, Hussey announced that both he and Regan had settled on a name, being "Hussey-Regan" and said "We thought it best to christen it with a name that says what it is on the box so as to avoid any confusion". It was also confirmed the recordings had a working title of Old, Borrowed and Blue and would include covers as well as new songs.

Curios
In August 2011, Hussey announced that an album full of material was going to be released later in the year. The title of the album was Curios; 12 tracks that included both covers of other artist material and original recordings. There were two versions made available; a limited edition (numbered and signed), released through Eyes Wide Shut Recordings available from September to November that year and after that date, through Cherry Red Records, both in digital and CD format.

Track listing:
 "Naked & Savage" (originally by The Mission)
 "Ordinary World" (originally by Duran Duran)
 "Enjoy the Silence" (originally by Depeche Mode)
 "Another Lonely Day" (originally by Ben Harper)
 "Wichita Lineman" (originally by Glen Campbell)
 "Ashes to Ashes" (originally by David Bowie)
 "I Go to Sleep" (originally by Ray Davies)
 "Where the Wild Roses Grow" (originally by Nick Cave and the Bad Seeds with Kylie Minogue)
 "Dangerous Eyes" 
 "Calling Your Name" (originally by All About Eve)
 "Unravel" (originally by Björk)
 "A Change in the Weather" (Aporia Mix)

Bonus tracks include: "You'll Never Walk Alone", "Wichita Lineman" (Myosotis Mix), "Enjoy The Silence" (Thinner Air Mix). There was also the inclusion of an "easter egg" in the artwork.

Charity single
In November 2011, the track "You'll Never Walk Alone" was released with all proceeds going to the Liverpool Football Club charity, Respect 4 All.

Discography

Studio albums
 Curios (2011)

Singles
 "You'll Never Walk Alone" (2011)
 "Enjoy the Silence" (4 June 2012)
 "Enjoy the Silence" (single Mix)
 "Enjoy the Silence" (Thinner Air Mix)
 "Dream On"
 "When the Body Speaks"

References

English musical duos
Musical groups established in 2006